Laonikos Chalkokondyles, Latinized as Laonicus Chalcocondyles (from λαός "people", νικᾶν "to be victorious", an anagram of Nikolaos which bears the same meaning; c. 1430 – c. 1470; The family name 'Chalcokondyles' is from χαλκος "brass",and κονδυλος "knuckle".) was a Byzantine Greek historian from Athens. He is known for his Demonstrations of Histories in ten books, which record the last 150 years of the Byzantine Empire.

Life 
The Chalkokondyles were one of the oldest native families in Athens and had gained great prominence. At the time of Laonikos it was ruled by the Florentine Acciaioli family. His father George was a kinsman of Maria Melissene, the wife of Duke Antonio I Acciaioli. When Antonio died in 1435, Maria attempted to secure control of the Duchy of Athens and sent George on a mission to the Ottoman Sultan Murad II, asking that the government of Athens might be entrusted to herself and George Chalkokondyles. However, during his absence, the Duchess was enticed out of the Acropolis and a young scion of the Acciaiuoli family, Nerio II, was proclaimed Duke of Athens. Meanwhile, George Chalkokondyles had his proposal rejected, despite offering the Sultan 30,000 gold pieces, and was cast into prison. George Chalkokondyles managed to escape to Constantinople, according to William Miller "leaving his retinue, tents and beasts of burden behind him", but after leaving Constantinople by ship, he was captured by an Athenian ship and taken back to the Sultan, who pardoned him.

George with Laonikos and the rest of the family relocated to the Peloponnese, which was under Byzantine rule as the Despotate of the Morea. In 1446 Constantine Palaiologos, then Despot of the Morea, sent George on a diplomatic mission to Murad II to obtain the independence of the Greek states south of Thermopylae; enraged at the offered terms, the Sultan put George Chalkokondyles into prison, then marched on Constantine's forces holding the Hexamilion wall on the Isthmus of Corinth and after bombarding it for three days, destroyed the fortifications, massacred the defenders, then pillaged the countryside, ending all hopes of independence. According to Miller, Laonikos was "evidently" an eye-witness to this battle, although the historian Theodore Spandounes claims Laonikos was the secretary of Murad II and present at the Battle of Varna in 1444.

The one glimpse we have of Laonikos himself is in the summer of 1447, when Cyriacus of Ancona met him in the summer of 1447 at the court of Constantine Palaiologos at Mistra. Cyriacus describes him as a youth  ("surprisingly learned in Latin and Greek literature"). It was at Mistra where Laonikos was taught by George Gemistos Plethon, and who gave Laonikos his personal copy of the Histories of Herodotus: Laur. Plut. 70.6, written in 1318, with corrections by Plethon, and later used by Bessarion in 1436 to make another copy, contains a subscription written by Laonikos.

Laonikos' movements and actions after 1447 are not known with certainty. His account of the circumcision of Sultan Mehmed II's sons in 1457 suggest he was an eye-witness to the event, and his account of Ottoman finances indicate he interviewed the Sultan's accountants. Internal evidence has led Byzantinist Anthony Kaldellis to put the date Laonikos stopped writing his Histories as 1464. While Laonikos Chalkokondyles greatly relied on Ottoman sources for the sections on the Ottomans, his narrative on the rule of Mehmed II is generally antagonistic. Thus, it has been argued that Laonikos Chalkokondyles was writing for the contemporary western audience in the Turcica genre rather than for the post-Byzantine intellectuals associated with the Ottoman court. Other speculations about Laonikos Chalkokondyles' life are not as widely accepted.

Portrayals in fiction 
In the 1954 Albanian–Soviet movie The Great Warrior Skanderbeg, Laonikos Chalkokondyles is portrayed as an official historian at the Ottoman Court with opportunistic views on politics who tries to discourage Skanderbeg from an anti-Ottoman insurrection. After Skanderbeg leaves the Ottoman army and becomes leader of Albania on his own right, Chalkokondyles is brought as a hostage to his court to witness the First Siege of Krujë.

The Histories of Chalkokondyles 
After the Fall of Constantinople, Chalkokondyles wrote his most important historical work, Demonstrations of Histories  (Ἀποδείξεις Ἱστοριῶν). This historical work comprises one of the most important sources for the students of the final 150 years of Byzantine history, despite being defective in its chronology. It covers the period from 1298 to 1463, describing the fall of the Byzantine empire and the rise of the Ottoman Turks, which forms the centre of the narrative, down to the conquest of the Venetians and Mathias, king of Hungary, by Mehmed II. The capture of Constantinople he rightly regarded as an historical event of far-reaching importance and compared it to the fall of Troy. The work also sketches other manners and civilization of England, France and Germany, whose assistance the Greeks sought to obtain against the Turks. For his account of earlier events he was able to obtain information from his father.

His model is Thucydides (according to Bekker, Herodotus), his language is tolerably pure and correct, and his style is simple and clear. The text, however, is in a very corrupt state. The archaic language he used made his texts hard to read in many parts, while the antiquarian names, with which he named people of his time, created confusion (Γέται, Δάκες, Λίγυρες, Μυσοί, Παίονες, Ἕλληνες). The extended use of the name "Hellenes" (Ἕλληνες), which Laonikos used to describe the Byzantines contributed to the connection made between the ancient Greek civilization and the modern one.

Chalkokondyles' History was first published in a Latin translation by Conrad Clauser at Basel in 1556, although the translation itself bears the date of November 1544. A French translation was published by Blaise de Vigenère in 1577 with a later edition by Artus Thomas, with valuable illustrations on Turkish matters. The editio princeps of the Greek text had to wait until 1615 for J. B. Baumbach's printing.

The two best editions are: Historiarum Libri Decem, ed. I. Bekker, Corpus Scriptorum Historiae Byzantinae (Bonn 1843) and Historiae Demonstrationes, 2 vols., ed. E. Darko, (Budapest 1922–7). The text can also be found in J.-P. Migne, Patrologia Graeca, volume 159.

A complete English translation (by Anthony Kaldellis) of The Histories was published in two volumes in 2014 by Harvard University Press, as volumes 33 and 34 of The Dumbarton Oaks Medieval Library. Partial translations include one of Books I-III in Laonikos Chalkokondyles. A Translation and Commentary of the Demonstrations of Histories, trans. Nikolaos Nikoloudis (Athens 1996) and another of Book VIII in J. R. Melville Jones, The Siege of Constantinople: Seven Contemporary Accounts (Amsterdam 1972), pp. 42–55.

See also
Chalkokondyles family
Greek scholars in the Renaissance

References

E. Darko, 'Zum Leben Laonikos Chalkondyles', Byzantinische Zeitschrift 24 (1923-4) 29–39.
Anthony Kaldellis, A New Herodotos: Laonikos Chalkokondyles on the Ottoman Empire, the Fall of Byzantium, and the Emergence of the West, Harvard University Press, 2014.

Further reading
There is a biographical sketch of Laonicus and his brother, Demetrius Chalcondyles in Greek by Antonius Calosynas, a physician of Toledo, who lived in the latter part of the sixteenth century: see C. Hopf, Chroniques Gréco-romanes (Paris 1873), pp. 243–5.
Hans Ditten, Der Russland-Exkurs des Laonikos Chalkokondyles : interpretiert und mit Erläuterungen versehen (Berlin 1968).
Jonathan Harris, "Laonikos Chalkokondyles and the rise of the Ottoman Empire", Byzantine and Modern Greek Studies 27 (2003), 153–70.
Nikolaos Nikoloudis, "Laonikos Chalkokondyles on the Council of Florence", Ekklesiastikos Pharos 3 (1992) 132–4.
Speros Vryonis, "Laonikos Chalkokondyles and the Ottoman budget", International Journal of Middle East Studies, 7 (1976), 423–32, and reprinted in Vryonis, Studies on Byzantium, Seljuks and Ottomans,  No. XII.
 Aslıhan Akışık, "Self and Other in the Renaissance: Laonikos Chalkokondyles and Late Byzantine Intellectuals" , Ph.D. dissertation, 2013.
Aslıhan Akışık-Karakullukçu, "A question of audience: Laonikos Chalkokondyles' Hellenism", Byzantinische Zeitschrift 112.1 (2019), 1-30.

External links
Opera Omnia by Migne Patristica Graeca with analytical indexes

1430s births
1470 deaths
Writers from Athens
15th-century Byzantine historians
Greek Renaissance humanists
Byzantine Athenians
15th-century Greek people
Laonikos
People from the Duchy of Athens
People of the Despotate of the Morea
15th-century Greek writers
15th-century Greek educators